A mammoth is any species of the extinct elephantid genus Mammuthus, one of the many genera that make up the order of trunked mammals called proboscideans. The various species of mammoth were commonly equipped with long, curved tusks and, in northern species, a covering of long hair. They lived from the Pliocene epoch (from around 5 million years ago) into the Holocene at about 4,000 years ago, and various species existed in Africa, Europe, Asia, and North America. They were members of the family Elephantidae, which also contains the two genera of modern elephants and their ancestors. Mammoths are more closely related to living Asian elephants than African elephants.

The oldest representative of Mammuthus, the South African mammoth (M. subplanifrons), appeared around 5 million years ago during the early Pliocene in what is now southern and eastern Africa. Descendant species of these mammoths moved north and continued to propagate into numerous subsequent species, eventually covering most of Eurasia before migrating into North America around 1.5-1.3 million years ago, becoming ancestral to the Columbian mammoth (M. columbi). The last species to emerge, the woolly mammoth (M. primigenius), developed about 400,000 years ago in East Asia, with some surviving on Russia's Wrangel Island in the Arctic Ocean, as well as possibly the Taymyr Peninsula on mainland Siberia, until as recently as roughly 3,700 to 4,000 years ago, still extant during the construction of the Great Pyramid of ancient Egypt.

Evolution
The earliest known proboscideans, the clade that contains the elephants, existed about 55 million years ago around the Tethys Sea area. The closest relatives of the Proboscidea are the sirenians and the hyraxes. The family Elephantidae is known to have existed six million years ago in Africa, and includes the living elephants and the mammoths. Among many now extinct clades, the mastodon is only a distant relative of the mammoths, and part of the separate Mammutidae family, which diverged 25 million years before the mammoths evolved.

The following cladogram shows the placement of the genus Mammuthus among other proboscideans, based on hyoid characteristics:

Since many remains of each species of mammoth are known from several localities, it is possible to reconstruct the evolutionary history of the genus through morphological studies. Mammoth species can be identified from the number of enamel ridges on their molars; the primitive species had few ridges, and the amount increased gradually as new species evolved and replaced the former ones. At the same time, the crowns of the teeth became longer, and the skulls become higher from top to bottom and shorter from the back to the front over time to accommodate this.

 
The first known members of the genus Mammuthus are the African species Mammuthus subplanifrons from the Pliocene and Mammuthus africanavus from the Pleistocene. The former is thought to be the ancestor of later forms. Mammoths entered Europe around 3 million years ago; the earliest known type has been named M. rumanus, which spread across Europe and China. Only its molars are known, which show it had 8–10 enamel ridges. A population evolved 12–14 ridges and split off from and replaced the earlier type, becoming M. meridionalis. In turn, this species was replaced by the steppe mammoth, M. trogontherii, with 18–20 ridges, which evolved in East Asia ca. 1.8 million years ago. Steppe mammoth populations replaced M. meridionalis in Europe between 1 and 0.7 million years ago.  The Columbian mammoth, M. columbi, evolved from a population of M. trogontherii that had entered North America over 1 million years ago. Mammoths derived from M. trogontherii evolved molars with 26 ridges between 800,000 and 400,000 years ago in Siberia, becoming the woolly mammoth, M. primigenius. The woolly mammoth would replace the steppe mammoth in Europe during the late Middle Pleistocene around 200,000 years ago. A 2011 genetic study showed that two examined specimens of the Columbian mammoth were grouped within a subclade of woolly mammoths. This suggests that the two populations interbred and produced fertile offspring. It also suggested that a North American form known as "M. jeffersonii" may be a hybrid between the two species.

By the late Pleistocene, mammoths in continental Eurasia had undergone a major transformation, including a shortening and heightening of the cranium and mandible, increase in molar hypsodonty index, increase in plate number, and thinning of dental enamel. Due to this change in physical appearance, it became customary to group European mammoths separately into distinguishable clusters:

 Early Pleistocene – Mammuthus meridionalis
 Middle Pleistocene – Mammuthus trogontherii
 Late Pleistocene – Mammuthus primigenius

There is speculation as to what caused this variation within the three chronospecies. Variations in environment, climate change, and migration surely played roles in the evolutionary process of the mammoths. Take M. primigenius for example: Woolly mammoths lived in opened grassland biomes. The cool steppe-tundra of the Northern Hemisphere was the ideal place for mammoths to thrive because of the resources it supplied. With occasional warmings during the ice age, climate would change the landscape, and resources available to the mammoths altered accordingly.

In February 2021, scientists reported that DNA from million-year old mammoth remains had become the oldest ever sequenced.

Etymology and early observations

The word mammoth was first used in Europe during the early 17th century, when referring to maimanto tusks discovered in Siberia. John Bell, who was on the Ob River in 1722, said that mammoth tusks were well known in the area. They were called "mammon's horn" and were often found in washed-out river banks. Some local people claimed to have seen a living mammoth, but they came out only at night and always disappeared under water when detected. He bought one and presented it to Hans Sloan who pronounced it an elephant's tooth.

The folklore of some native peoples of Siberia, who would routinely find mammoth bones, and sometimes frozen mammoth bodies, in eroding river banks, had various interesting explanations for these finds. Among the Khanty people of the Irtysh River basin, a belief existed that the mammoth was some kind of a water spirit. According to other Khanty, the mammoth was a creature that lived underground,  burrowing its tunnels as it went, and would die if it accidentally came to the surface.
The concept of the mammoth as an underground creature was known to the Chinese, who received some mammoth ivory from the Siberian natives; accordingly, the creature was known in China as yǐn shǔ 隐鼠, "the hidden rodent".

Thomas Jefferson, who famously had a keen interest in paleontology, is partially responsible for transforming the word mammoth from a noun describing the prehistoric elephant to an adjective describing anything of surprisingly large size. The first recorded use of the word as an adjective was in a description of a large wheel of cheese (the "Cheshire Mammoth Cheese") given to Jefferson in 1802.

Description

Like their modern relatives, mammoths were quite large. However, most species of mammoth were only about as large as a modern Asian elephant (which are about 2.5 m to 3 m high at the shoulder, and rarely exceeding 5 tonnes). Both sexes bore tusks. A first, small set appeared at about the age of six months, and these were replaced at about 18 months by the permanent set.

Based on studies of their close relatives, the modern elephants, mammoths probably had a gestation period of 22 months, resulting in a single calf being born. Their social structure was probably the same as that of African and Asian elephants, with females living in herds headed by a matriarch, whilst bulls lived solitary lives or formed loose groups after sexual maturity.

The fat also allowed the mammoths to increase their muscle mass, allowing the mammoths to fight against enemies and live longer. Woolly mammoths evolved a suite of adaptations for arctic life, including morphological traits such as small ears and tails to minimize heat loss, a thick layer of subcutaneous fat, long thick fur, and numerous sebaceous glands for insulation , as well as a large brown-fat hump like deposit behind the neck that may have functioned as a heat source and fat reservoir during winter.

Diet
Depending on the species or race of mammoth, the diet differed somewhat depending on location, although all mammoths ate similar things. For the Columbian mammoth, M. columbi, the diet was mainly grazing. American Columbian mammoths fed primarily on cactus leaves, trees, and shrubs. These assumptions were based on mammoth feces and mammoth teeth. Mammoths, like modern day elephants, have hypsodont molars. These features also allowed mammoths to live an expansive life because of the availability of grasses and trees.

For the Mongochen mammoth, its diet consisted of herbs, grasses, larch, and shrubs, and possibly alder. These inferences were made through the observation of mammoth feces, which scientists observed contained non-arboreal pollen and moss spores.

European mammoths had a major diet of C3 carbon fixation plants. This was determined by examining the isotopic data from the European mammoth teeth.

The arctic tundra and steppe where the mammoths lived appears to have been dominated by forbs, not grass. These were richer in protein and easier to digest than grasses and wooden plants, which came to dominate the areas when the climate became wetter and warmer. This could have been a major contributor to why the arctic megafauna went extinct.

The Yamal baby mammoth Lyuba, found in 2007 in the Yamal Peninsula in Western Siberia, suggests that baby mammoths, as do modern baby elephants, ate the dung of adult animals. The evidence to show this is that the dentition (teeth) of the baby mammoth had not yet fully developed to chew grass. Furthermore, there was an abundance of ascospores of coprophilous fungi from the pollen spectrum of the baby's mother. Coprophilous fungi are fungi that grow on animal dung and disperse spores in nearby vegetation, which the baby mammoth would then consume. Spores might have gotten into its stomach while grazing for the first few times. Coprophagy may be an adaptation, serving to populate the infant's gut with the needed microbiome for digestion.

Mammoths alive in the Arctic during the Last Glacial Maximum consumed mainly forbs, such as Artemisia; graminoids were only a minor part of their diet.

Extinction

The woolly mammoth (M. primigenius) was the last species of the genus. Most populations of the woolly mammoth in North America and Eurasia, as well as all the Columbian mammoths (M. columbi) in North America, died out around the time of the last glacial retreat, as part of a mass extinction of megafauna in northern Eurasia and the Americas. Until recently, the last woolly mammoths were generally assumed to have vanished from Europe and southern Siberia about 12,000 years ago, but new findings show some were still present there about 10,000 years ago. Slightly later, the woolly mammoths also disappeared from continental northern Siberia. A small population survived on St. Paul Island, Alaska, up until 3750 BC, and the small mammoths of Wrangel Island survived until about 2000 BC Recent eDNA research of sediments indicates mammoths survived in north central Siberia at least as late as 2000 BC, in continental northeast Siberia until at least 5300 BC, and until at least 6600 BC in North America.

The warming trend (Holocene) that occurred 12,000 years ago, accompanied by a glacial retreat and rising sea levels, has been suggested as a contributing factor. Forests replaced open woodlands and grasslands across the continent. The available habitat would have been reduced for some megafaunal species, such as the mammoth. However, such climate changes were nothing new; numerous very similar warming episodes had occurred previously within the ice age of the last several million years without producing comparable megafaunal extinctions, so climate alone is unlikely to have played a decisive role. The spread of advanced human hunters through northern Eurasia and the Americas around the time of the extinctions, however, was a new development, and thus might have contributed significantly. 

Whether the general mammoth population died out for climatic reasons or due to overhunting by humans is controversial. During the transition from the Late Pleistocene epoch to the Holocene epoch, there was shrinkage of the distribution of the mammoth because progressive warming at the end of the Pleistocene epoch changed the mammoth's environment. The mammoth steppe was a periglacial landscape with rich herb and grass vegetation that disappeared along with the mammoth because of environmental changes in the climate. Mammoths had moved to isolated spots in Eurasia, where they disappeared completely. Also, it is thought that Late Paleolithic and Mesolithic human hunters might have affected the size of the last mammoth populations in Europe. There is evidence to suggest that humans did cause the mammoth extinction, although there is no definitive proof. It was found that humans living south of a mammoth steppe learned to adapt themselves to the harsher climates north of the steppe, where mammoths resided. It was concluded that if humans could survive the harsh north climate of that particular mammoth steppe then it was possible humans could hunt (and eventually extinguish) mammoths everywhere. Another hypothesis suggests mammoths fell victim to an infectious disease.
A combination of climate change and hunting by humans may be a possible explanation for their extinction. Homo erectus is known to have consumed mammoth meat as early as 1.8 million years ago, though this may mean only successful scavenging, rather than actual hunting. Later humans show greater evidence for hunting mammoths; mammoth bones at a 50,000-year-old site in South Britain suggest that Neanderthals butchered the animals, while various sites in Eastern Europe dating from 15,000 to 44,000 years old suggest humans (probably Homo sapiens) built dwellings using mammoth bones (the age of some of the earlier structures suggests that Neanderthals began the practice). However, the American Institute of Biological Sciences notes that bones of dead elephants, left on the ground and subsequently trampled by other elephants, tend to bear marks resembling butchery marks, which have allegedly been misinterpreted as such by archaeologists.

In 2021, a study using ancient environmental DNA concluded that the extinction of the mammoth was primarily caused by dramatic vegetation changes at the end of the Last Glacial Maximum, due to a changed climate and precipitation regime. During the Last Glacial Maximum, the Arctic would have had a homogeneous flora consisting of mammoth steppe-associated plants, supporting a unique community of grazing mammals, including the mammoth. Increased precipitation following the end of the LGM caused a significant paludification of the steppe, which has been linked to a general decrease in species diversity of the region's former inhabitants, and not just mammoths. In addition, the study found mammoths to have persisted on the mainland for far longer than previously thought, with their shrinking distribution roughly tracking the shrinkage of the mammoth steppe; their final mainland refugium, the Taymyr Peninsula, was roughly concurrent with the Wrangel population. The close relationship between decreasing mammoth populations and steppe, as well as the lack of a sudden decline that would be associated with the human overkill hypothesis, indicates that humans and mammoths may have coexisted for millennia, and thus humans may have only played a minor role in the species' extinction.

Many hypotheses also seek to explain the regional extinction of mammoths in specific areas. Scientists have speculated that the mammoths of Saint Paul Island (Alaska), an isolated enclave where mammoths survived until about 8,000 years ago, died out as the island shrank by 80–90% when sea levels rose, eventually making it too small to support a viable population. Similarly, genome sequences of the Wrangel Island mammoths indicate a sharp decline in genetic diversity, though the extent to which this played a role in their extinction is still unclear. Another hypothesis, said to be the cause of mammoth extinction in Siberia, comes from the idea that many may have drowned. While traveling to the Northern River, many of these mammoths broke through the ice and drowned. This also explains bones remains in the Arctic Coast and some of the New Siberian Islands.

Dwarfing occurred with the pygmy mammoth on the outer Channel Islands of California, but at an earlier period. Those animals were very likely killed by early Paleo-Native Americans, and habitat loss caused by a rising sea level that split Santa Rosae into the outer Channel Islands.

Mammoth-elephant hybrid

One proposed scientific use of this preserved genetic material is to recreate living mammoths. This has long been discussed theoretically but has only recently become the subject of formal effort due to advances in molecular biology techniques and cloning of mammals.

According to one research team, a mammoth cannot be recreated, but they will try to eventually grow in an "artificial womb" a hybrid elephant with some woolly mammoth traits. Comparative genomics shows that the mammoth genome matches 99% of the elephant genome, so some researchers aim to engineer an elephant with some mammoth genes that code for the external appearance and traits of a mammoth. The outcome would be an elephant-mammoth hybrid with no more than 1% mammoth genes. Other projects are working on gradually adding mammoth genes to elephant cells in vitro.

See also

 Genesis 2.0, a documentary
 Ivory trade
 La Brea tar pits
 List of mammoths
 The Mammoth Site in Hot Springs, South Dakota
 Niederweningen Mammoth Museum
 Pleistocene Park
 Waco Mammoth National Monument

References

Further reading

 
 
 
 
 
 
 
 
 
 
 
 

 
Cenozoic mammals of Africa
Cenozoic mammals of Asia
Cenozoic mammals of Europe
Cenozoic mammals of North America
Holocene extinctions
Pleistocene proboscideans
Prehistoric elephants
Taxa named by Joshua Brookes
Zanclean first appearances